Heritage is an outdoor 1935 sculpture by American artist James Earle Fraser, installed in front of the National Archives Building in Washington, D.C., United States. Heritage is a companion piece to Guardianship.

The National Archives Foundation's Heritage Award, which recognizes "individuals, corporations, and organizations whose deeds are consistent with the Foundation's mission of educating, enriching, and inspiring a deeper appreciation of our country's heritage", is named after the sculpture.

See also
 1935 in art
 List of public art in Washington, D.C., Ward 6

References

External links
 

1935 establishments in Washington, D.C.
1935 sculptures
Outdoor sculptures in Washington, D.C.
Sculptures of women in Washington, D.C.
Statues in Washington, D.C.
Works by James Earle Fraser (sculptor)
Federal Triangle